Gebe Airport  is an airport located in Gebe, Central Halmahera Regency, North Maluku, Indonesia.

Airlines and destinations

References 

Airports in North Maluku